The Times Square Comedy Festival is an annual comedy festival started in 2015. The festival is produced by American Egyptian producer Hatem Gabr and Rethink Production. The Times Square Comedy Festival consists of few live stand up comedy shows like "Up Close & Personal" and "Live From Broadway" as well as new comedians competitions and other activities all around Times Square.

The Times Square Comedy Festival takes place all around Times Square venues and some Broadway theaters.

The Times Square Comedy Festival is generally held in May or June and features some of the biggest names in comedy. The First edition in 2015 of the Times Square Comedy Festival featured headliners including Colin Quinn, Dan Naturman, Godfrey and Keith Robinson.

The 2016 Edition will be held at the legendary Diamond Horseshoe at the Paramount hotel.

References

Links
the interro bang.com - on December 15, 2014 http://theinterrobang.com/russell-peters-crushed-packed-madison-square-garden-george-wallace-tv-taping-whats-new-colin-quinn-artie-lange-joe-list/
Times Square NYC .ORg http://www.timessquarenyc.org/events/2756/up-close--personal-stand-up-comedy-show/details.aspx#.VHb8CzHF_uI
http://www.theatermania.com/off-off-broadway/shows/times-square-comedy-festival_308584/
http://www.averagesocialite.com/2014/12/up-close-personal-on-broadway-dec-13.html
https://web.archive.org/web/20150418075147/http://bestevents.us/new-york-up-close-amp-personal-on-broadway-live-stand-up/108689
http://www.timessquarecomedyfestival.com/
http://www.timessquarenyc.org/events/2920/times-square-comedy-festival/details.aspx
http://www.timessquarenyc.org/events/2756/up-close--personal-stand-up-comedy-show/details.aspx#.VHb8CzHF_uI
http://www.theatermania.com/off-off-broadway/shows/times-square-comedy-festival_308584/

2015 establishments in New York City
Comedy festivals in the United States
Festivals in New York City
Festivals established in 2015
Times Square